Eagle Township is a township in Kingman County, Kansas, USA.  As of the 2000 census, its population was 154.

Geography
Eagle Township covers an area of 36.39 square miles (94.24 square kilometers); of this, 0.04 square miles (0.12 square kilometers) or 0.13 percent is water.

Unincorporated towns
 Belmont
 Orsemus
(This list is based on USGS data and may include former settlements.)

Adjacent townships
 Dale Township (north)
 Vinita Township (northeast)
 Allen Township (east)
 Bennett Township (southeast)
 Canton Township (south)
 Valley Township (southwest)
 Richland Township (west)
 Ninnescah Township (northwest)

Cemeteries
The township contains one cemetery, Greenwood.

References
 U.S. Board on Geographic Names (GNIS)
 United States Census Bureau cartographic boundary files

External links
 US-Counties.com
 City-Data.com

Townships in Kingman County, Kansas
Townships in Kansas